Eveleen Tennant Myers (21 November 1856 – 12 March 1937) was an English photographer.

Biography

Tennant was the third daughter of Charles Tennant (1796–1873) and Gertrude Barbara Rich Collier (1819–1918). Her sister was the artist, Dorothy Tennant. She married the classicist, poet, and psychical researcher Frederic William Henry Myers (1843–1901) in 1880.  They had two sons, the elder the novelist Leopold Hamilton Myers (1881–1944), and a daughter, the author Silvia Myers Blennerhassett.

Tennant posed for the Pre-Raphaelite painters George Frederic Watts and John Everett Millais.

Myers took up photography in 1888, taking pictures of her family and visitors. She was self-taught. She later gave up her practice after the death of her husband in 1901, dedicating her time to publishing Frederic W.H. Myers' writing.

Collections

The National Portrait Gallery, London holds 203 of her photographic portraits, as well as 30 portraits with Myers née Tennant as the subject.
Tate in London holds portrait paintings by Watts and by Millais of Myers.

References

Further reading

External links

 Eveleen Myers 1856-1937

1856 births
1937 deaths
British portrait photographers
English women photographers
19th-century English photographers
People from Bloomsbury
Photographers from London
19th-century women photographers
19th-century English women